Pierre Mélin (7 November 1863, Essonnes - 23 November 1929) was a French politician. At first he joined the French Workers' Party (POF), which in 1902 merged into the Socialist Party of France (PSdF), which in turn merged into the French Section of the Workers' International (SFIO) in 1905. He was a member of the Chamber of Deputies from 1906 to 1910 and from 1914 to 1919.

References

1863 births
1929 deaths
People from Corbeil-Essonnes
Politicians from Île-de-France
French Workers' Party politicians
Socialist Party of France (1902) politicians
French Section of the Workers' International politicians
Members of the 9th Chamber of Deputies of the French Third Republic
Members of the 11th Chamber of Deputies of the French Third Republic